"Dom andra" (Swedish for The Others) is a song by Swedish alternative rock band Kent. It was released as the first single from their fifth album Vapen & Ammunition on 18 March 2002. The song debuted at number one on the Swedish Singles Chart, becoming the band's first number-one hit; it stayed at the position for four weeks, and remained in the charts for twenty-one weeks overall.

The song's CD single includes the B-side "Vintervila" that is a remake of a song composed before Kent had formed and the band used the name Havsänglar (Sea-Angels). On the sleeve is a photo of one of the Eskilstuna Zoo's white tigers (taken by Jonas Linell).

The track won Song of the Year at both the 2003 Grammis and 2003 P3 Guld awards.

Music video 
The music video shows a woman driving a car (Ferrari 456 GT) through Stockholm at night.

Track listing

Charts

References 

Kent (band) songs
2002 singles
Number-one singles in Sweden
2002 songs
Songs written by Joakim Berg
Music videos shot in Stockholm
Music videos showing Stockholm